Colin Boreham (born 26 March 1954) is a British athlete. He competed in the men's decathlon at the 1984 Summer Olympics. Representing Northern Ireland, he finished eighth in the decathlon at the 1982 Commonwealth Games.

References

1954 births
Living people
Athletes (track and field) at the 1984 Summer Olympics
British decathletes
Olympic athletes of Great Britain
Decathletes from Northern Ireland
Athletes (track and field) at the 1982 Commonwealth Games
Commonwealth Games competitors for Northern Ireland
Sportspeople from Luton